The 2004–05 season was Tottenham Hotspur's 13th season in the Premier League and 27th successive season in the top division of the English football league system.

Season summary
Tottenham made a promising start under Jacques Santini and looked to be challenging for a place in Europe, but Santini resigned in November after only 12 games, citing personal reasons. He was replaced by his assistant coach Martin Jol, whose first match in charge saw arch-rivals Arsenal win a thrilling North London derby 5–4. Following the derby defeat results picked up and Tottenham were soon back amongst the race for a UEFA Cup spot, but a draw with Blackburn Rovers on the last day of the season saw their slim European hopes dashed. Nonetheless, good cup runs and the resurgence in the league under Jol gave Spurs fans hopes of a greater push for European football the next season.

Players

First-team squad

Left club during season

Reserve squad

Transfers

In

Out
  Gus Poyet – retired, 12 May
  Christian Ziege – released, 12 May (later joined  Borussia Mönchengladbach on 9 June)
  Darren Anderton – released, 12 May (later joined  Birmingham City on 10 August)
  Hélder Postiga –  Porto, 8 July, £5,000,000
  Stephen Carr –  Newcastle United, 10 August, £2,000,000
  Gary Doherty –  Norwich City, 20 August, undisclosed
  Mbulelo Mabizela – released, 25 October (later joined  Orlando Pirates on 12 January)
  Mauricio Taricco –  West Ham United, 19 November, free
  Jamie Redknapp –  Southampton, 4 January, free
  Kasey Keller –  Borussia Mönchengladbach, 15 January, free
  Edson Silva –  ADO Den Haag, 31 January, free
  Mark Hughes –  Oldham Athletic, 15 February, free
  Dean Richards – retired, 21 March
  Jamie Slabber –  Aldershot Town
  Lars Hirschfeld –  Leicester City, January

Loan in
  Radek Černý –  Slavia Prague
  Mido –  Roma, 26 January, 18 months

Loan out
  Kasey Keller –  Southampton, 12 November, one month
  Calum Davenport –  Southampton, 3 January, season-long
  Lars Hirschfeld –  Dundee United, August

Transfers in:  £20,300,000
Transfers out:  £7,000,000
Overall spending:  £13,300,000

Trialists
  Edson Silva –  PSV (successful)
  Dagui Bakari –  Lens (unsuccessful)
  Márton Fülöp –  MTK (successful)

Competitions

Results

Premier League

FA Cup

League Cup

Final league table

Statistics

Appearances and goals
Up to end of season

|-
! colspan=14 style=background:#dcdcdc; text-align:center| Goalkeepers

|-
! colspan=14 style=background:#dcdcdc; text-align:center| Defenders

|-
! colspan=14 style=background:#dcdcdc; text-align:center| Midfielders

|-
! colspan=14 style=background:#dcdcdc; text-align:center| Forwards

|-
! colspan=14 style=background:#dcdcdc; text-align:center| Players transferred out during the season

|}

Goal scorers 

The list is sorted by shirt number when total goals are equal.

Clean sheets

The list is sorted by shirt number when total clean sheets are equal.

References

Notes

Tottenham Hotspur
Tottenham Hotspur F.C. seasons